The Comité Européen de l'Industrie de la Robinetterie, mostly known as the CEIR or the European Association for the Taps and Valves Industry, is the European trade association for the taps and valves industry.

History
It was formed in 1959. The taps and valves industry is currently worth €19 billion.

Structure
Within the 13 member national trade associations it has 340 member companies - 95 for sanitary valves, 60 for building valves (gas, water and fire-fighting valves), and 185 in industrial valves (including valve actuators). It is located in the same building as Pneurop.

The European Association for the Valves and Taps industry is truly democratic, no national association can veto decisions. Like a true democracy and in a way that mirrors the European Union dynamic, the decisions at Board level are taken in consensus. 

These industries cover products such as industrial valves, butterfly valves, valve actuators, relief valves, pressure-reducing valves, central heating thermostatic valves, taps and cocks.

The constituent organisations include:
  The Federation of Finnish Technology Industries
  Profluid - Association française des pompes et agitateurs, des compresseurs et de la robinetterie
  AVR - Associazione italiana construttori valvole e rubinetteria
  AIMMAP - Associãcao dos Industrias Metalúrgicos, Metalomecãnicos e Afins de Portugal
  Научно-Промышленная Ассоциация Арматуростроителей (NPAA) - Scientific & Industrial Valve Manufacturers Association
  AGRIVAL - Asociación Nacional de Fabricantes de Griferia y Valvuleria
  Svensk Armaturindustri
  URS - Verband Schweizerischer Armaturenfabriken (Union de Fabriques Suisses de Robinetterie)
  POMSAD - Türk Pompa ve Vana Sanayicileri Derneği (Turkish Pump & Valve Manufacturers' Association)
  Ukrainian Association for Valves Industry
  The Bathroom Manufacturers Association

Besides the General Assembly and the Board, 3 Committees exist :
 Marketing & Communication Committee
 Sanitary Technical Committee
 Building & Industrial Valves Technical Committee

Function
It holds its annual meeting in April or May. The 2012 meeting was held in May near Paris, in Chantilly. It was organised by Profluid, the French association 
The 2013 annual meeting will take place in Belgium in Ghent. The event will take place on 24 and 25 May. It is organised in a new way so that the 24 conference is open to any persons having an interest in taps and valves and not only members. This conference will be under the heading of innovation, high level speakers from the Ghent Vlerick business school, from Solvay, from Cefic, the trade association for the chemical industry and from FECS will address the audience.

Dynamics
The European Association for the Taps and Valves industry has been very active since 2011. It changed its image with a new website, a newsletter, a corporate image and new designed slides. The association also changed its organisational structure to make it effective and best armed to deliver results.

Technical Works
CEIR's Sanitary Technical Committee is constituted of experts from main taps & showerheads manufacturers in Europe. Its main tasks are regulatory follow-up at European level, standardization follow-up and pre-normative works. It also represents taps & showerheads manufacturers views and interests as CEIR is a registered stakeholder at the European Commission.
CEIR is involved in the following topics:
 Construction Products Regulation
 Materials in contact with drinking water
 REACH Regulation
 Water saving initiative and in particular the development of the European ecolabel for taps & showerheads

CEIR's Building & Industrial Valves Technical Committee deals with a great variety of topics. Applicable regulations are numerous and include :
 ATEX directive
 Construction Products Regulation
 Pressure Equipment Directive

Building and industrial valves are used in a complex normative framework, that the Technical Committee is in charge to follow, that includes CEN TC69 and ISO TC153 for industrial valves, CEN TC236 for gas valves and CEN TC164 for building valves.

Water label
CEIR is heavily involved in the European water label. This voluntary labelling scheme was launched during the European Commission Green Week 2012. It enables consumers to make an informed choice when they buy taps, showerheads or control flow devices. Consumers can very easily and very quickly understand the water flow and thus consumption of the device.

CEIR will promote its Water Label during the ISH 2013 trade fair.

See also
 Plumbing & Drainage Institute - USA

References

External links
 

Bathroom fixture companies
Trade associations based in Belgium
Organizations established in 1959
Pan-European trade and professional organizations
Valve manufacturers